2084 may refer to:

 2084 is a number in the 2000–2999 range

Time
 2084 CE (year), MMLXXXIV, the year A.D. 2084
 2084 BC (year), the year 2084 BCE

Places
 2084 Okayama, Asteroid #2084, also called Okayama
 Farm to Market Road 2084, Texas Road 2084, in the U.S.A.

People
 Tom Tom MMLXXXIV (musician), a music arranger who worked on the 2002 Liam Hayes album Fed (album)

Entertainment works/titles
 Robotron: 2084, a 1982 video game in the Robotron series of videogames
 2084: The End of the World, a 2015 French-language novel by Boualem Sansal
 2084: Il potere dell'immortalità nelle città del dolore, a 2013 Italian-language novel by Menotti Lerro
 2084 (film), a 1984 science fiction film
 2084, a comics work by Goran Parlov

Other uses
 SMPTE ST 2084, standard #2084 from SMTPE, also called Perceptual Quantizer (PQ)
 United Nations Security Council Resolution 2084, resolution #2084 passed by the U.N. Security Council
 Partnership to Build America Act (H.R. 2084), a federal bill introduced by U.S. Representative John Delaney, see Political positions of John Delaney

See also

 
 
 Solar eclipse of January 7, 2084
 Solar eclipse of July 3, 2084
 Solar eclipse of December 27, 2084
 January 2084 lunar eclipse, on the 22nd